Beneteau or Bénéteau is a French sail and motor boat manufacturer, with production facilities in France and in the United States. The company is a large and recognized boat builder, commanding a substantial worldwide market, with its holding company (Groupe Beneteau) now also holding other prestige brands such as Jeanneau and its multihull subsidiary Lagoon in 1995.

History
Shipwright  founded the company in 1884, at Croix-de-Vie, France to build sailing trawlers.  In the mid sixties, Benjamin's grandchildren Annette Bénéteau Roux and her brother André Bénéteau introduced a line of fiberglass boats.

Production
The main production facility is in France with five factories in the Vendée area of France. As of May, 2017, the Marion plant has built and distributed more than 8,700 boats. The Marion plant was closed in September 2020 and production was moved to the facilities in France.

Beneteau Sailing Models

Early Models

One Design Racing

Racer/Cruiser - First Series

These are racer/cruiser sailboats, with a higher emphasis on the racing aspects, yet are substantially equipped for comfortable cruising. Equipped with tall fractional rigs, high performance keels and upgraded deck hardware. Introduced in 1976 with the First 30 model designed by Andre Mauric.  Current First models being offered include:

Sense Series 
Introduced in 2010, the Sense range is a modern interpretation of a cruising yacht, incorporating several industry firsts, while the company continued to produce the more conventional Oceanis cruising range. It introduced innovations to deck, superstructure, and interior design.
 Sense 50 (First built in 2010)
 Sense 43 (First built in 2011)
 Sense 55 (First built in 2012)
 Sense 46 (First built in 2013)
 Sense 57 (First built in 2016)

Oceanis Series

Seascape 
In 2018 Beneteau purchased Seascape and rebrand it products under the Beneteau First brand.

Beneteau Powerboats Models

Swift Trawler Series 
These are trawler yacht powerboats. The Swift Trawler 42 was the company's first trawler yacht and the first Beneteau powerboat to reach the U.S. Market.

Outboard motorboats
These are outboard powered motorboats in three different models: Antares cabincruisers, Barracuda seafishing boats and Flyer consoleboats.

Notable boats or models

Beneteau 31
Beneteau 361
Beneteau First 235
Beneteau First 285
Beneteau Oceanis 321
Mumm 36
Platu 25

See also
 List of sailboat designers and manufacturers
 Jeanneau 
 Lagoon

References

External links 

 

Beneteau